Aljan (also Romanized as Aljān; also known as Alchān, Algān, and Algon) is a village in Khurheh Rural District, in the Central District of Mahallat County, Markazi Province, Iran. At the 2006 census, its population was 13, in 4 families.

References 

Populated places in Mahallat County